The 1928 Volta a Catalunya was the tenth edition of the Volta a Catalunya cycle race and was held from 8 September to 16 September 1928. The race started and finished in Barcelona. The race was won by Mariano Cañardo.

Route and stages

General classification

References

1928
Volta
1928 in Spanish road cycling
September 1928 sports events